Nazem Ganjapour (March22, 1943February21, 2013) was an Iranian football player. In the last match of Shahin against Tehranjavan, he scored a hat trick. After this he joined Persepolis. Later, he was a scout and coached youth clubs.

Club career
He played for Shahin from 1964 to 1967, then Persepolis from 1968 to 1971.

National career
He played in RCD Cup 1967 for Iran national football team. He has only one cap to his name, a match against Pakistan on November 24, 1967.

Records
He is the last player who scored for Shahin.
He is the first player who scored for Persepolis.
He is the first Persepolis player that could score in Tehran derby.

References

Persepolis F.C. players
1943 births
2013 deaths
People from Ahvaz
Iranian footballers
Iranian football managers
Shahin FC players
Iran international footballers
Association football forwards
Sportspeople from Khuzestan province